Stade d'Abidjan is an Ivorian football club based in Abidjan.

History
It was founded in 1936 as ASFI Abidjan after fusion with PIC and OC Abidjan and called U.S.F. Abidjan, before was renamed in Olympique Club Abidjan, since 1959 played as Stade d'Abidjan. They play at the Stade Municipal d'Abidjan.

Achievements
 Côte d'Ivoire Premier Division: 5
1962, 1963, 1965, 1966, 1969.

 Côte d'Ivoire Cup: 5
1971, 1976, 1984, 1994, 2000.

Coupe de la Ligue de Côte d'Ivoire: 0

 Coupe Houphouët-Boigny: 2
1985, 2018.

 African Cup of Champions Clubs: 1
1966.

West African Club Championship (UFOA Cup): 1
1977.

Performance in CAF competitions
 African Cup of Champions Clubs: 3 appearances
1966: Champion
1967: Quarter-finals
1970: Quarter-finals

CAF Confederation Cup: 2 appearances
2004 – Second Round
2005 – Second Round

CAF Cup Winners' Cup: 5 appearances
1985 – First Round
1995 – Second Round
1996 – Second Round
1997 – First Round
2001 – Second Round

CAF Cup: 1 appearance
2000 – Semi-finals

Current squad

Managers
 Sir Cecil Jones Attuquayefio (1989–90)

References

External links
Club profile – soccerway.com

Football clubs in Abidjan
Association football clubs established in 1936
1936 establishments in Ivory Coast
Sports clubs in Ivory Coast
CAF Champions League winning clubs